Molard may refer to: 
 Jackie Molard, French musician, important figure in traditional Breton music
 Mount Richard-Molard, a mountain along the border of Côte d'Ivoire and Guinea in West Africa
 Saint-Étienne-le-Molard, a commune in the Loire department in central France

See also
 Mollard (disambiguation)